Frunzensky (masculine), Frunzenskaya (feminine), or Frunzenskoye (neuter) is the name of several rural localities in Russia:
Frunzensky, Orenburg Oblast, a settlement in Krasnogvardeysky District of Orenburg Oblast
Frunzensky, Samara Oblast, a settlement in Bolsheglushitsky District of Samara Oblast
Frunzenskoye, Chechen Republic, a stanitsa in Naursky District of the Chechen Republic
Frunzenskoye, Kaliningrad Oblast, a settlement in Pravdinsky District of Kaliningrad Oblast